Owen Ronald (born 9 May 1993) is a Scottish footballer who plays for Linlithgow Rose as a forward. He played in the Scottish League and the SPFL for Queen's Park, Berwick Rangers, Airdrieonians, Stenhousemuir and Albion Rovers and represented Scotland at U18 schoolboy level.

Personal life 
Ronald's father is former footballer Paul Ronald.

Honours 

 Scottish League Young Player of the Month: March 2012

Career statistics

References

Scottish footballers
1993 births
Association football forwards
Footballers from Glasgow
Living people
Queen's Park F.C. players
Airdrieonians F.C. players
Stenhousemuir F.C. players
Albion Rovers F.C. players
Dumbarton F.C. players
Berwick Rangers F.C. players
Kirkintilloch Rob Roy F.C. players
Cumnock Juniors F.C. players
Cumbernauld Colts F.C. players
Kilbirnie Ladeside F.C. players
Linlithgow Rose F.C. players
Scottish Professional Football League players
Scottish Football League players
Lowland Football League players
Scottish Junior Football Association players